Scottish Athletics, stylised as scottishathletics, is the governing body for the sport of athletics in Scotland. Established as a limited company on 1 April 2001, it succeeded the Scottish Athletics Federation (SAF) and is a member of the Commonwealth Games Council for Scotland. Scottish Athletics is part of UK Athletics, the national governing body for the United Kingdom.

The organisation has a small staff, but is largely supported by volunteers. It deals with approximately 170 athletics clubs and roughly 14,000 members. Individual clubs differ in size from less formal and small number of members to customary clubs with hundreds of members. There are specialist clubs and other clubs which incorporate all areas of athletics.

Sponsors and partners

sport scotland 
The major partner for providing funding for Scottish athletics is sportscotland. They are Scotland’s national agency for sport and greatly believe that there are great benefits to be gained from sport. The benefits they believe that can be gained include enjoyment and achievement from taking part and the shared pride that is created from national success.
Their mission is to encourage the people of Scotland to take part in sports and develop a sporting experience. Therefore, increasing the number of participants and the performance in sports in Scotland.  They aim to reach their goals by assisting and inspiring their partners  and applying funding in key areas while advising on future strategies and policies.

Joma Sport 
The official supplier of athletics gear to Scottish Athletics is Joma Sport, who provide kit to all Scottish international teams, their coaches and officials, heading towards the 2022 Commonwealth Games in Birmingham.

Lindsays 

The law firm Lindsays began sponsoring the Scottish Cross Country season in 2014, and this sponsorship was renewed in 2016 until 2020.

Others 

A number of other organisations and groups support and partner with Scottish athletics, the most notable of which are:

 Scottish Government
 Scottish Association for Mental Health
 Local Authorities in Scotland

Previous 

The following companies and organisations were notable previous sponsors:

 Bank of Scotland
 Highland Spring - Supported championships events and the jogscotland programme.

Governance

Scottish Athletics is a Limited Company (SC217377), with no Share Capital. Its membership is primarily affiliated athletics clubs in Scotland and members, but may also include schools, companies and associate members. Only clubs, schools and associated members may vote at the AGM, through mandated delegates. The Chief Executive is Colin Hutchinson. 

The Board of Directors oversees the operation of the company. The President is Ron Morrison.  The role of chairman has been held by David Ovens since September 2021.

Commissions 
Formal commissions oversee the day to day operation of specific areas, including the operation of certain championships and series, team selection and development of officials.

 Hill running Commission
 Officials Commission
 Road and Cross country running Commission
 Track and Field Commission

See also
 Sport in Scotland
 sportscotland
 UK Athletics

References

External links
 Scottish Athletics Official website
 Scottish Athletic Club Directory
 Power of 10 ranking website
 UK Athletics limited official website
 Scottish Association of Track Statisticians
 Scottish Athletics Road Running & Cross Country Commission

Athletics
Athletics in Scotland
2001 establishments in Scotland
Sports organizations established in 2001
National members of the European Athletic Association